Dathopa Tissa II was King of Anuradhapura in the 7th century, whose reign lasted from 664 to 673. He succeeded his brother Dappula I as King of Anuradhapura and was succeeded by Aggabodhi IV.

See also
 List of Sri Lankan monarchs
 History of Sri Lanka

References

External links
 Kings & Rulers of Sri Lanka
 Codrington's Short History of Ceylon

D
D
D
D